Asosa or Assosa is the capital of Benishangul-Gumuz Region, Ethiopia.

History 
A Belgian force from the Congo captured Asosa on 11 March 1941, destroying the Italian 10th Brigade and capturing 1,500 men.

During the Ethiopian Civil War, with help from the Eritrean People's Liberation Front (EPLF) the Oromo Liberation Front (OLF) captured Asosa from the Derg in early January 1990, and held the city for a brief time. During the occupation, the government airforce subjected Asosa to aerial attacks several times that month, killing 19 people and wounding 20. Before the OLF withdrew from Asosa, it destroyed the town's only electricity generator, stole 1.8 million Birr from the bank, most of which were deposits from the local farmer cooperatives, and took any valuable items its troops could carry.

During the 1990s, Asosa was characterised by entire government office complexes of partially completed buildings, which John Young notes was "testimony to corrupt relations between politicians and contractors." Young continues, "Indicative of the scale of the problem, during a peace and development conference held in Asosa in June 1996, the then deputy prime minister, Tamrat Layne, dismissed the entire regional government and had many of its members imprisoned for corruption."

The governor of the town of Asosa, Ahmed Khalifa, on 7 July 2007 fled to Ad-Damazin, the capital of the Blue Nile State, in Sudan. Khalifa was accused by the Ethiopian authorities of offering concessions to Sudan on border issues. Sudan turned down a request to return Khalifa to Ethiopia, resulting in increased tensions between the two countries.

Demographics 

Based on figures from the Central Statistical Agency in 2005, Asosa has an estimated total population of 20,226, of whom 10,929 are men and 9,297 are women.

The 1994 national census reported a total population for Asosa of 11,749 in 2,825 households, of whom 6,324 were men and 5,425 women. The six largest ethnic groups reported in this town were the Oromo (41.19%), the Amhara (29.93%), the Berta (17.39%), the Tigrayan (5.43%), the Sebat Bet Gurage (1.35%), and the Silt'e (1.29%); all other ethnic groups made up 3.42% of the population. Oromiffa was spoken as a first language by 44.42%, 31.53% spoke Amharic, 15.98% Berta, and 4.43% Tigrinya; the remaining 3.64% spoke all other primary languages reported. The majority of the inhabitants professed Ethiopian Orthodox Christianity, with 54.92% of the population having reported they practised that belief, while 29.75% of the population said they were Muslim, and 14.89% were Protestant. It is the largest settlement in Asosa woreda.

Climate

Notable people
Meaza Ashenafi (born 1964), lawyer and women's rights activist

See also 

 List of cities and towns in Ethiopia

References 

Populated places in the Benishangul-Gumuz Region
Ethiopia
Cities and towns in Ethiopia